The Rhythmic Gymnastics European Championships are the European championships for the sport of rhythmic gymnastics. They were first held in 1978. The European Championships and the European Junior Championships were united in 1993. Prior to 2006, they were called the European Rhythmic Gymnastics Championships. The competition is organised by the European Union of Gymnastics.

Editions
Seniors and Juniors:

Medalists

Team

Senior Individual

Senior All-Around

Rope

Hoop

Ball

Clubs

Ribbon

Senior Groups

All-Around

Single apparatus

Mixed apparatus

All-time medal table
1978–2022, senior events only
 Last updated after the 2022 Rhythmic Gymnastics European Championships

Multiple gold medalists

Boldface denotes active rhythmic gymnasts and highest medal count among all rhythmic gymnasts (including these who not included in these tables) per type.

All events

Individual events

Records

Junior European Championships

The Junior European Championships in rhythmic gymnastics were first held for the first time in 1987. Prior to 1993, they were held as a separate event. Since the 1993 edition in Bucharest, Romania, the Junior European Championships were integrated to the senior European Championships.

See also
Rhythmic Gymnastics World Championships

References

External links
European Union of Gymnastics
European Rhythmic Timeline

 
European Championships
Rhythmic Gymnastics
Recurring sporting events established in 1978
Gymnastics in Europe